This is an overview of incidents of vigilantism in the Indian state of Kerala.

Background

In India, vigilante groups (or "moral police" as they are also known) act to enforce a code of morality. Some of India's laws, and some actions of police forces in India are also considered to be instances of moral policing. The targets of moral policing are any activity that vigilante groups, the government or police deem to be "immoral" and/or "against Indian culture".

2019

Idukki, 2019
A 27-year-old man from Kerala, who was trying to moral police a 17-year-old girl and a 23-year-old man, was stabbed and injured in the process. The incident took place at a private bus stand in Thodupuzha in Idukki district on Saturday evening.

Trivandrum, 14 December 2019
A case has been registered against the secretary of the Press Club here for alleged moral policing and trespassing into the house of a woman colleague at Pettah

Malappuram, 15 November 2019 
Tirur police on Thursday booked two men from Malappuram district for attacking a couple who were travelling with their toddler.

Wayanad, 25 November - 2019
A case of moral policing has been reported from Wayanad. A youth was stripped naked and brutally beaten up with his hands tied at the back. The pictures of the incident, which took place on Saturday night, was circulated on social media

2017

Cochin, 2017
In March 2017, Shiva Sena activists caned and abused young couples sitting and talking in Marine Drive, Kochi. The local police mostly supported the activists without taking any action.

Palakkad, 2017
24-year-old Aneesh from Korara Anagada in Agali died as the victim of a vigilante attack in Quilon.  His crime was visiting the Azhikkal Beach with a girlfriend.

Palakkad, 2015
In February 2015, K.M.Parabhaakran of Cherpulasshery was killed by a group of vigilante youth for an alleged immoral activity. Around 15 men attacked Prabhakaran when he was found near the house of a woman.  The culprits were not arrested as of 2017.

Cochin, 2014
 In June 2014, a female theatre artiste and her male colleague were detained in police custody for traveling together at night, which stirred protests against moral policing on social media. Hima Shankar and her friend Sreeram Rameshand were arrested because they were travelling in a two-wheeler late at night. They were not released from the police station even after the parents came and clarified the issue.
 In July 2013, police arrested a couple from a beach in Alappuzha for suspected "immoral activity" as the woman was not wearing any accessories to suggest that she was married.
 A month earlier, police were accused of asking money from young couples travelling on motor cycles threatening that they will inform the girl's father.
 In June 2011, An IT professional, on her way to work at Kochi's IT park, was accosted by a group of drunken men because she was riding pillion on a male colleague's bike. The drunken men argued with her, and then abused and slapped her. Several similar cases have been reported throughout Kerala.
 In April 2013, an artist from Kochi was harassed by two policewomen when she went for a stroll on Marine Drive with a male friend.

Calicut, 2016
 In 2016, National Institute of Technology Calicut, Kozhikode issued an order prohibiting girl students walking with boy students near the residential quarters of teachers and clerks because the families of the teachers objected to practice of falling in love before marriage.
 In February 2013, in Vatakara, Kozhikode, a 19-year-old boy died after falling from his two-wheeler. He was trying to escape to group of people chasing him and an under-15 girl with him. The girl was also wounded and was admitted to a hospital. 
 On 23 October 2014, a restaurant in Kozhikode was attacked and vandalised. The attackers claimed that eatery was facilitating immoral activities. The attack came after a local Malayalam-language TV channel broadcast a report claiming that some coffee shops and restaurants in Kozhikode had become centres of "immoral activities".
 On 14 July 2015, a Madhyamam Daily journalist and her husband were attacked by a group at her office. They did not accept that they were married. The police arrived before the incident escalated. Later, a Communist Party of India (Marxist) leader was arrested for leading the attack.

Malappuram, 2016
Mankada village in Malappuram district attracted the attention of national newspapers in 2016 when a 42-year-old man was beaten to death by his neighbors for visiting his girlfriend in the night.

Kasaragod, 2016
A Hindu student of Zainab College was stabbed by Muslim vigilante for drinking fruit juice with his Muslim girlfriend during a birthday celebration.

Kollam, 2016
A young man was killed by vigilante people who mistook him for another young man who kept a girl friend. The vigilante people attacked him while his helmet was still on. When they removed the helmet, they understood the mistake.  By the time, the young man had already died. his happened at Mundakkal in Kollam district of Kerala.

Kannur, 2012
In June 2012,  a gang of men attacked and beat up a pregnant woman sitting alone in a bus shelter in Kannur. The woman's husband had asked her to rest while  he went to a nearby ATM since she was heavily pregnant.
In 2012 December, a young man called P.V.AneeshKumar was attacked at Manna junction, Taliparamba by a group of men for the crime of talking with a girl of different community.

Kodiyathur, 2011
In November 2011, Shaheed Bava of Kodiyathur near Calicut was killed by the locals for visiting a woman in the night. He was attacked with wooden pieces and other weapons and there were 51 wounds on his body. Only nine people were convicted for this murder. Most of the culprits escaped from any punishment.

Kottayam, 1997
In 1997, a lawyer named Sabu Thomas from Kerala filed an obscenity case against the author Arundhati Roy, claiming that the 21st chapter of The God of Small Things contains obscene scenes.

Movements against vigilantism

Hug of Love, 2014
A group of students at Maharaja's College, Ernakulam protested against moral policing by conducting an event named Hug of Love. All the participants were later suspended for 10 days by the college authorities for violating the code of conduct.
Another group of students from Government Law college, Kozhikode organized an event called Hug Of Love on 10 December. Authorities took this as an act of indiscipline and served show cause notice to participants.

Kiss against Fascism, 2014
A protest against moral policing in Thiruvananthapuram with kisses and hugs under the banner Kiss against fascism was conducted in front of the Kairali theatre complex during the 19th International Film Festival of Kerala (IFFK) on 13 December.

Kiss of Love protest, 2014

The Kiss of Love protest was sparked off in October 2014 when Jaihind TV, a Malayalam news channel owned by the Indian National Congress, telecast an exclusive report on alleged immoral activity at the parking space of Downtown Cafe in Kozhikode. The video showed a young couple kissing and hugging each other. A mob of attackers, who were later identified as belonging to the Bharatiya Janata Yuva Morcha vandalized the cafe following the report. Following this, Rahul Pasupalan, a short film maker from Kerala together with his wife Resmi R Nair and a group of friends from a Facebook page called Freethinkers, started the Facebook page Kiss of Love.  Activists from all over Kerala decided to protest against the series of moral policing incidents by organizing a public event at Marine Drive beach on 2 November in Kochi.
The kiss in the street protests which is a bigger protest than kiss of love were held in multiple places in Calicut in following months.
The protest was very popular on social networking sites and news media. The opposing groups allegedly compelled the Facebook authorities block the Kiss of Love page through mass reporting on 3 November. The profile pages of all of the administrators were blocked as well. One of the administrators said that the page had 50,000 members at the time of blocking. The page was reinstated later that day and the number of members soon crossed 75,000. Supporters of the campaign have been posting pictures of them kissing on social networking sites.

References

Culture of Kerala
Vigilantes
Tourism in Kerala